Logan Library is a public library in Logan, Utah. It serves the 50,000 citizens of Logan with a collection of about 200,000 informational and recreational items, more than 500 events each year for people for all ages, five public meeting rooms, free wireless Internet access, and computers (desktop, laptop, and tablets for in-house use).

Collection
The Logan Library maintains collections of popular materials in fiction, nonfiction, children's, young adult, large print, magazines, Spanish, graphic novels, and audiovisual materials (DVDs, CDs, etc.) of many formats.

In addition to the popular collections, the library maintains its Virginia Hansen Special Collections Room composed of local history items, the remnant of the Everton Genealogy Collection plus other genealogy helping aids, and the library's collection of bound periodicals.

Programs & Activities
The library provides more than 500 free programs throughout the year which are popular with community members of all ages. These include summer reading programs with prizes and activities, regular story times, afterschool programs, film showings every Monday evening, monthly family game nights, informational classes, an annual community fair featuring local nonprofit organizations, an annual writers conference, an art wall featuring local visual artists, and Helicon West, a longstanding literary open mic event with featured readers.

Management Structure
Under Utah state statute, Logan Library is governed by a board of trustees consisting of seven members drawn from the community and approved by the mayor. The board meets on a monthly basis. The day-to-day operations of the library are managed by the board-chosen director and a staff of nine librarians, 14 circulation staff, four pages, one custodian, and a small group of dedicated volunteers.

Funding
The Logan Library is funded by a dedicated property tax and therefore prospective cards holders must prove Logan residency, or business or property ownership, before circulation privileges are granted. Anyone living outside Logan may purchase a library card for an annual fee of $163.00 per household.

History
Logan Library traces its history to the library which was formally established by Logan City on April 18, 1916. The library's collection consisted of the donated libraries of St. John's Episcopal Church (1,200+ titles) and the LDS Mutual Improvement Association in Logan. In October 1920, the library came under the direction of Cache County, in accordance with Utah House Bill 97. County and city each agreed to pay half the operating costs. The new Cache County Library was housed in a rental property, later nicknamed "The Dungeon." A new library building was erected at 90 North 100 East in Logan in 1932. This building still stands.

For the next 25 years, Cache County Library grew and expanded. Local businesses and individual members of the community donated cash, books, and furniture. The library had a large and popular genealogy collection, a space used as headquarters for the local Boy Scouts, and hosted art shows and concerts.  The building and its contents became a source of pride for Cache County citizens. Unfortunately, after a few years, problems with the structure itself were evident: the roof leaked, there were issues with the boiler, and the lighting was considered inadequate.  Most of these problems were handled in temporary fashion until funds could be procured for more permanent solutions.

In the 1960s, the library board met infrequently, calls for expanded service to County citizens in the form of a bookmobile were rejected, arguments erupted among the many groups using the library building (including the ever more powerful genealogy librarian), the need for building improvements was recognized but little action was taken, individual monetary gifts to the library began to decrease, and (for several years) the library recorded budget deficits. The library's director for much of this time (1940s to the 1970s) was Miss Virginia Hansen.

In the 1970s, Cache County leaders indicated that they were interested in divesting themselves of the library and, in 1976, after many contentious debates about the future (including the discussion of a possible county-wide library system), Cache County sold its half of the library back to Logan City, recreating the Logan Library.

In 1981, Mr. Ronald Jenkins was hired as director and, five years later, the Logan Library moved into its current location at 255 North Main (a remodeled Sears department store) in a dual-use arrangement with the city offices. During his directorship, the library expanded greatly in the quality and quantity of both its collection and services.

In 2009, the Library was given the use of its entire building when the city offices moved into a new building.

In 2011, Jenkins retired after 30 years as the library's director, having become the longest-serving library director in Utah. Robert Shupe, former Director of the Mohave County Library District, was hired as the new Director.

In December 2012, the library reached a milestone event having checked out over 1 million items during the previous year.

In 2017, Karen Clark, a 20-year employee of the library, was hired as director.

On February 14, 2022, the library building at 255 North Main Street was demolished and is currently in the process of being rebuilt at the same location. The library materials are still available on a limited capacity at the Logan City Service Center at 950 West 600 North.

Construction of the new library is expected to be completed in the spring or summer of 2023.

References

External links
 
 

Public libraries in Utah
Buildings and structures in Logan, Utah
Education in Cache County, Utah